The 1986 NCAA Division I Women's Tennis Championships were the fifth annual championships to determine the national champions of NCAA Division I women's singles, doubles, and team collegiate tennis in the United States.

The women's team championship was won by Stanford, their second title in three years. This was the first time that the men's and women's team from the same school won championships in the same year. The Cardinal defeated rivals USC in the final round, 5–4.

The women's singles title was won by Patty Fendick from Stanford.

The women's doubles title was won by South African Lise Gregory and American Ronni Reis from Miami (FL).

Host site
This year's tournaments were held at the Penick-Allison Tennis Center at the University of Texas at Austin in Austin, Texas. The men's and women's tournaments would not be held at the same site until 2006.

Team tournament

See also
1986 NCAA Division I Men's Tennis Championships
NCAA Division II Tennis Championships (Men, Women)
NCAA Division III Tennis Championships (Men, Women)

References

External links
List of NCAA Women's Tennis Champions

NCAA Division I tennis championships
College women's tennis in the United States
NCAA Division I Women's Tennis Championships
NCAA Division I Women's Tennis Championships
NCAA Division I Women's Tennis Championships